ApNano Materials is a nanotechnology company, wholly owned and operated by Nanotech Industrial Solutions (NIS) with R&D lab, manufacturing, blending and packaging facilities in Avenel, New Jersey, United States, and Yavne, Israel. NIS is the only company in the world with an exclusive license to manufacture inorganic fullerene-like tungsten disulfide (IF-WS2) submicron (nanosized) spherical particles on a commercial scale with the patent from the Weizmann Institute. These inorganic fullerene-like tungsten disulfide-based nanomaterials opened up new possibilities for developing extreme performance industrial lubricants, coatings, and polymer composites.

History
Dr. Menachem Genut and Mr. Aharon Feuerstein founded the company in 2002. Dr. Genut served as President and CEO until 2010, and Mr. Feuerstein served as Chairman of the Board and CFO until 2010.[2]
 
In 2013 AP Nano became a wholly owned subsidiary of the leading American company “Nanotech Industrial Solutions, Inc.” Today, the CEO of NIS is Dr. George Diloyan, Ph.D. and CFO is Mr. Steven Wegbreit. ApNano's COO is Dr. Alexander Margolin, Ph.D. Mr. Itsik Havakuk serves as Vice President of Global Sales and Marketing.

Technology
NIS is specializing in commercial manufacturing of nanoparticles of Inorganic Fullerene-like Tungsten Disulfide (IF-WS2). The particles are called Inorganic Fullerene-like (IF), because of the near spherical geometry and a hollow core – similar to carbon fullerenes. The name “fullerenes” or “buckyballs” came from the architectural modeler Richard Buckminster Fuller, who popularized the geodesic dome.  Professor Reshef Tenne discovered Inorganic Fullerene-like nanoparticles (IF-MXy where M- is transition metal and X - is chalcogen group) at the Weizmann Institute of Science in 1992. The diameter of the primary particle can range between 20 – 280 nm. IF-WS2 nanoparticles with a hollow sphere (Fullerene-like) morphology, provide extreme lubricity, anti-friction, and high impact resistance (up to 35 GPa).

Unlike standard solids that have platelet-like structures with moderate tribological properties, IF-WS2 particles have tens of caged concentric layers, making these particles excel under extreme pressure or load, thus significantly reducing friction and wear. 
(also see tribology).

Products

IF-WS2 Formulated

In late 2018 APNano and NIS have undergone substantial structural changes, updating the product line and changing the name from “NanoLub” to “IF-WS2 Formulated.”  IF-WS2 formulations are designed to lower friction and operating temperature, thereby reducing mechanical wear. At the same time, contact pressure causes submicron spheres of IF-WS2 to release tribofilms that attach to surface, reduce wear and filling asperities and smooth them, improving overall efficiency while extending machinery life. The company offers industrial lubricant additives and tribological packages based on IF-WS2 particles. The additives are available as a dispersion in oil, water, and solvent. Possible applications include, but not limited to, lubricants, grease, metalworking fluids, coatings, paints, and polymers used in mining, marine, heavy machinery, power station, space, and military industrial sectors.

References

External links
The official website for APNano|http://www.apnano.com/
The official website for Nanotech Industrial Solutions|http://nisusacorp.com/

Nanotechnology companies